Douala is the largest city in Cameroon and its economic capital. It is also the capital of Cameroon's Littoral Region. Home to Central Africa's largest port and its major international airport, Douala International Airport (DLA), it is the commercial and economic capital of Cameroon and the entire CEMAC region comprising Gabon, Congo, Chad, Equatorial Guinea, Central African Republic and Cameroon. Consequently, it handles most of the country's major exports, such as oil, cocoa and coffee, timber, metals and fruits. , the city and its surrounding area had an estimated population of 5,768,400. The city sits on the estuary of Wouri River and its climate is tropical.

History

The first Europeans to visit the area were the Portuguese in about 1472. At the time, the estuary of Wouri River was known as the Rio dos Camarões (Shrimp River). By 1650, it had become the site of a town formed by immigrants, said to have arrived from Congo, who spoke the Duala language. During the 18th century it was the center of the transatlantic slave trade.

In 1826 Douala appeared to be made of four different villages located in four specific locations: the village of Deido (Dido), of Akwa, of Njo and Hickory-town (today Bonaberi, located on the other side of Wouri River).

Between 1884 and 1895 the city was a German protectorate.
The colonial politics focused on commerce and some exploration of the unoccupied territories. In 1885, Alfred Saker organized the first mission of the British Baptist Church. In the same year the city known as Kamerun was renamed Douala and became the capital of the territory until 1902, when the capital was moved to Buéa.

In 1907 the Ministry of Colonies was established and Douala had 23,000 citizens.

After World War I in 1919, the German colonial territories became French and British protectorates. France received a mandate to administer Douala. A treaty was signed with the local chiefs.

From 1940 to 1946, it was the capital of Cameroon. In 1955 the city had over 100,000 inhabitants.

In 1960, Cameroon gained independence as a federal republic, with its capital in Yaoundé. Douala became the major economic city. In 1972, the federal republic became a unitary state. Douala then had a population of around 500,000.

In the 1980s, in Cameroon the struggle for liberalization and multi-party democracy grew. Between May and December 1991, Douala was at the center of the civil disobedience campaign called the ghost town operation (ville morte) during which economic activities shut down to make the country ungovernable and to force the government to allow multi-partitism and freedom of expression.

Name 
With the arrival of the Portuguese in the 15th century, the area was known as Rio dos Camarões. Before coming under German rule in 1884, the town was also known as Cameroons Town; thereafter it became Kamerunstadt ("Cameroon City"), the capital of German Kamerun.  It was renamed Douala in 1907 after the name of the natives known as Dua ala Ijaws (Njos), and became part of French Cameroon in 1919. Many of the Ijaw (Njo) natives migrated to the Niger Delta in Nigeria during the Portuguese era.

Geography 

The city is located on the banks of the Wouri River, the two sides linked by Bonaberi Bridge.

Climate 
Douala features a tropical monsoon climate (Köppen climate classification Am), with relatively consistent temperatures throughout the course of the year, though the city experiences somewhat cooler temperatures in July and August.

Population 

Evolution of population in Douala (in thousands)

With 1.9 million inhabitants in 2005, Douala is the most populated city of Cameroon.

Languages

Cameroon is home to nearly 250 languages or dialects. The local indigenous language is Duala, which shares its name with the city. French and English are official languages, but Douala is primarily francophone.
In 2014, 63.7% of Douala inhabitants of over 15 years knew how to read and write French, while 76.4% knew how to speak and understand French.

Urbanism and contemporary life

The city of Douala is divided into seven districts (Akwa, Bassa, Bonabéri, Bonapriso, Bonanjo, Deïdo and New Bell) and it has more than 120 neighborhoods.

Some of the neighborhoods of Douala include
 Akwa. Akwa is Douala's business district and Bonanjo its administrative district. Plateau Joss is the name used historically for the current district of Akwa. The name of the districts refer to the Douala lineage, as well as the neighborhoods. For example, Akwa was historically divided between Bell and Deido into Bonadibong, Bonamilengue, Boneleke, Bonalembe, Bonejang, Bonamuti, Bonabekombo, Bonaboijan, and Bonakuamuang; the prefix "bona" means "descendant of".

 Bali, housing area located near Bonanjo administrative area.
 Bépanda is a very densely populated  neighborhood. It is probably the most inhabited area of the city with many inhabitants from West Africa and from all parts of the country. The seat of the University of Douala and an important telecommunication center of the Cameroon telecommunications are located there.
 Deido is a historical neighborhood located in the north central part of the city. It includes one of the main junctions of the city known as Le Rond-Point Deïdo and the symbol of the city “the Njounjou” (“the monster”).
 Bonaberi is located on the right of Wouri River. It is primarily an industrial neighborhood but is gradually becoming a mixed area including more residential and commercial areas. It is connected by the two only bridges of the city. It is also the main opening toward the western anglophone area of the country.
 Bonapriso is one of the wealthiest area of the city and even of the country. Historically a residential neighborhood, it has become a mixed area including  commercial galleries, restaurants and shops.
 Bonanjo is the administrative neighborhood, with many large administrations, larger companies and banks offices, with higher buildings than the rest of the city
 Bonamoussadi is the main housing area located in the northern part of the city. In a first time very residential, it has recently witnessed a significant surge in the installation of malls, supermarkets, restaurants and even night clubs.
 Kotto is a modern residential neighborhood next to Bonamoussadi. It developed in the early 1980s with the housing projects of the Société immobilière du Cameroun (SIC) and is now the prime area for the small but increasing  middle and upper classes of the city.
 New Bell is an historical neighborhood of the city. It was founded in the early 20th century with the expropriation by the Germans of the natives Duala people from the plateau Joss. It is known for housing since then newcomers in the city from all parts of the country and even from abroad (mainly west Africa). It today a very populous neighborhood with very tough conditions. Two of the main markets of the city (Central market and Marché Nkololoun) are in the area.

 Bassa is a vast area in the eastern part of the city. It is a mixed area including  many neighborhoods (some wealthier than others) such as Logbaba, Ndogpassi, Cité des Palmiers, PK 8 and many others. It also includes one of the two major industrial zones of the city (the other being in Bonaberi).

Architecture 

According to Jacques Soulillou, historical images of Douala document the areas of Akwa (Plateau Joss) and the port between 1860 and 1960, while the districts of Bonaberi, Deido and New Bell have almost no images. The archives which provide documentation about the city are based in Paris, Basel, Hamburg, Potsdam, Douala and Yaoundé.

In 1896 a first urban plan of the city was developed during the German colonial period. The plan included a hospital, the governor residency, the palace of justice, the police station, administrative buildings and buildings for the port and customs (among those the Old Woermann Linie Bachelors House). The Bonakouamouang Chimney also dates back to this period. In 1904 construction of the Villa Mandessi Bell was begun. In 1905 the palace of the King Manga Ndumbe Bell (also called la Pagode) was built, and in 1906 the general plan of Gross Douala was established. In 1914 the large population living in Bonanjo was moved to the new estate of Neue Bell (New Bell).

Between 1925 and 1930, during the French colonial period, the chamber of commerce, the new palace of justice, the new railway station, the vault of the Kings Bell and the catholic cathedral of Saints Peter and Paul were built. Constructions were intensified between 1930 and 1955 and in 1955 the bridge on Wouri River was built. In 1935 the Mausoleum of the Kings Akwa was constructed. In 1947 the Temple of the Centenary was built. In 1959 a new city plan was designed (Plan Dorian); according to Danièle Diwouta-Kotto, this plan is still influencing Douala's urban development. After the independence of 1960 a new development and urban plan were established. In 1998 a research prepared the diagnostic for the 2015 horizon. In 2005 a new development and urban plan was designed and routes and public canalizations were reestablished and created. In the same year the Project Sawa-Beach was  launched. Since 1888, terracotta bricks have been  produced in Douala.

The publication Suites architecturales focuses on heritage and reappropriation in the architecture of Douala, and it presents some of the characteristics of the buildings and architecture of Douala after its independence. Among those buildings are the casino, the show-room La Meublerie, the exhibition hall Cami-Toyota, Union Bank of Cameroon, Immeuble Hollando, the Baptist church, Immeuble Victoria, headquarters of CA-SCB, espace doual'art, and Orange Flagship. The Palace Dika Akwa Mukanda was built in 1990.

Along the city's main thoroughfare lie some of Cameroon's best restaurants, coffee houses and French-style patisseries; along the waterfront, many bars and bistros may be found, commanding views of the Gulf of Guinea and nearby mangrove swamps.  Many of these are frequented by the city's large expatriate population, mainly French or Lebanese, most of whom work in the petroleum industry.

Culture 
 Douala Maritime Museum, a museum showcasing the rich maritime history of Douala. The building is shaped like a boat (however, the museum only occupies 400 m2 of the building). It is located in the administrative area Bonanjo
 Doual'art, an art gallery/center
 La Nouvelle Liberté, a 12m piece from Joseph Francis Sumégné inaugurated in 2007. A permanent monumental sculpture made with recycled material located at a main roundabout in Douala. It is 12 meters high with a wingspan of 5 meters.
 The Cathedral of St Peter and St Paul
 The Centennial Temple

Places of worship 
The city's population is predominantly Christian and contains houses of worship of numerous denominations : Roman Catholic Archdiocese of Douala (Catholic Church), Evangelical Church of Cameroon (World Communion of Reformed Churches), Presbyterian Church in Cameroon (World Communion of Reformed Churches), Union of Baptist Churches in Cameroon (Baptist World Alliance), Integrity for All (Christian Missionary Fellowship and Associated Churches), Full Gospel Mission Cameroon (Assemblies of God). There are also Muslim mosques.

A small community has begun to practice Judaism in Douala, but they do not have a synagogue yet.

Education 

As in most large cities in Cameroon there are several nursery, primary, secondary and high schools in the city. In recent years there has been a surge in the number of private schools.  It is interesting to note that there is also a large, informal educational sector that caters to a huge part of the population, mostly individuals with a primary school certificate or those with no education at all.  This form of education is common in sectors like cloth manufacturing, bread making, construction, security, and car repairing. Individuals from these informal sectors are by far the most visibly deprived in neighborhoods such as Ndokoti, Bepanda, Village, Logbaba.

The city of Douala is home to a number of higher education institutions, including the University of Douala. There are also a number of professional schools, the most prominent one being the Douala Maritime institute. Douala has an aviation school called CAE Oxford Aviation Academy Douala.

Transportation 

Douala is linked by rail to Yaoundé, Ngaoundéré, Kumba and Nkongsamba. Douala has a fairly developed road network compared to other cities in Cameroon. However many of the city's roads have decayed due to years of neglect and corruption. Efforts have recently been made to renovate the city's roads, especially in the most deprived neighborhoods. In spite of the numerous domestic and international investments, the roads remain in deplorable state largely due to embezzlement and corruption. 

A tram network is planned for Douala, with the first line projected to open in 2021.

The Douala International Airport is located in the eastern part of the city. There are direct flights to several European cities, including Paris, Brussels, and Istanbul. Regional and continental destinations include Abidjan, Brazzaville, Dakar, Johannesburg, Kinshasa, Lagos, Malabo, and Nairobi. The airport is the busiest in the CEMAC area and is the hub for Cameroon's national carrier, Camairco. The airport is in dire need of renovations due to poor circulation and old infrastructure.

The seaport has  of draft.

Economy 
Douala is a city with a modest oil resource in Africa, but is in excellent agricultural condition, therefore it has one of best economies in Africa. However, it also faces some problems like other underdeveloped countries such as heavy civil service and bad climate (flood, tornado, storm) to business.

Main economic parameters are:

GDP: $42.2 billion (2006 est.):
 GDP growth rate: 4.1% (2006 est.)
 Exports-partners: Spain 17.3%, Italy 13.8%, France 9.5%, South Korea 8.1%, UK 8.1%, Netherlands 7.9%, Belgium 4.9%, US 4.3% (2005)
Imports - partners: France 21%, Nigeria 15%, Belgium 6.3%, China 5.6%, US 5.1%, Thailand 4.5%, Germany 4.2% (2005)

Wealth and poverty 
Even though Douala is the economic center of Cameroon, a large percentage of its inhabitants live below the poverty line. Recent data shows that about thirty percent of the population lives in poverty (Avameg, Inc). While the aforementioned percentage is doubled for rural regions, poverty is a growing problem for Douala due to its steadily increasing population. Unlike the rural populations of Cameroon that can grow their own foods to lessen their expenses, Douala locals are disadvantaged by living in the port city where there are not many opportunities for monetary gain.

Notable people 
 

 Ibrahim Amadou (1993–), footballer
 Patrick Baudry (1946–), second French astronaut and first astronaut of an African country
 Prince René Douala Manga Bell (1927–2012), chief of Douala 
 Francis Bebey (1929–2002), author 
 BeBe Zahara Benet (1980-), drag queen
 Mister Bibal (Samuel Ludwig Salla), (1988-) musician and producer
 Hemley Boum (1973–), writer
 Jean-Alain Boumsong (1979–), footballer
 Louis Brody (1892–1951), German actor
 Manu Dibango (1933–2020), musician, saxophonist and singer, world jazz, ethno-jazz.
 Herman Dzumafo (1980-), footballer
 Angèle Etoundi Essamba (1962–), photographer
 Samuel Eto'o (1981–), footballer
 Kareyce Fotso (2010-), singer 	
Kenny Kadji (born 1988), basketball player in the Israeli Basketball Premier League
 Christian Koloko (2000–), basketball player
 Narcisse Mouelle Kombi(1962– ), writer and politician
 Maka Kotto (1961–), Canadian politician
 Guy Kouemou (1970-), inventor and aerospace engineer 
 Bobby Kamwa (2000-), footballer 
 Jacques Kuoh-Moukouri (1909-2002), author and diplomat
 Thérèse Kuoh-Moukouri (1938–), feminist and author 
 Véronique Mang (1984–), track athlete
 Marc Kibong Mbamba (1988–), footballer
 Christian Ngan (1983– ), entrepreneur, businessman and financier
 Paul-Georges Ntep (1992–), footballer
 Petit Pays (1967–), singer, dancer, author
 Jean-Pierre Dikongué Pipa (1940–), cineast
 Pascal Siakam (1994– ), basketball player - 2019 NBA Champion
 Pierre Womé (1979–), footballer
 Carlos Takam (1980-), professional boxer

Twin towns – sister cities
Doula is twinned with the following places:
 Strasbourg, France
 Akhisar, Turkey
 Dakar, Senegal
 Newark, United States
 Philadelphia, United States
 Windhoek,  Namibia

See also 
 List of colonial governors of Cameroon
 Timeline of Douala

References

Further reading

  Brooke, James (1987). "Informal Capitalism Grows in Cameroon." The New York Times. November 30.
  Derrick, Jonathan (1977). "Review of Douala: ville et histoire by René Gouellain." Africa: Journal of the International African Institute. 47:4.
  Diwouta-Kotto, Danièle (2010). Suites architecturales: Kinshasa, Douala, Dakar. Épinal: Association VAA.
  Elate, Som Simon (2004). "African Urban History in the Future." In Steven Salm and Toyin Falola (eds), Globalization and Urbanization in Africa. Trenton: Africa World Press.
  Gouellain, René (1969). Douala, ville et histoire. Paris: Institut d'ethnologie Musée de l'homme.
  Hance, William (1964). The Geography of Modern Africa. New York: Columbia University Press.
  Lambi, C. M. and Hombe, L. F. (2002). "Environmental Hazards and Landuse Planning for Sustainable Development: the Douala Unstable Coastal Region." In R. G. Macinnes and Jenny Jakeways (eds), Instability: Planning and Management. London: Thomas Telford.
  Lauber, Wolfgang (1988). Architectures allemandes au Cameroun 1884-1914. Stuttgart: Karl Kramer Verlag.
  Levine, Victor (1971). The Cameroon Federal Republic. Ithaca, NY: Cornell University Press.
  Mainet, Guy (1985). Douala, croissance et servitudes. Paris: L'Harmattan.
  Njoh, Ambe (2003). Planning in Contemporary Africa. Aldershot: Ashgate.
  Séraphin, Gilles (2000). "Vivre à Douala. L'imaginaire et l'action dans une ville africaine en crise". Paris: L'Harmattan.
  Simone, A. M. (2004). For the City Yet to Come: Changing African Life in Four Cities. Durham: Duke University Press.
  Soulillou, Jacques (1989), Douala, un siècle en images. Paris: L'Harmattan.
  Schler, Lynn (2008), The Strangers of New Bell: Immigration, Public Space and Community in Colonial Douala 1914–1960 (Pretoria: Unisa).
  Brooke, James (1987). "Informal Capitalism Grows in Cameroon." The New York Times. November 30.
  Derrick, Jonathan (1977). "Review of Douala: ville et histoire by René Gouellain." Africa: Journal of the International African Institute. 47:4.
  Diwouta-Kotto, Danièle (2010). Suites architecturales: Kinshasa, Douala, Dakar. Épinal: Association VAA.
  Elate, Som Simon (2004). "African Urban History in the Future." In Steven Salm and Toyin Falola (eds), Globalization and Urbanization in Africa. Trenton: Africa World Press.
  Gouellain, René (1969). Douala, ville et histoire. Paris: Institut d'ethnologie Musée de l'homme.
  Hance, William (1964). The Geography of Modern Africa. New York: Columbia University Press.
  Lambi, C. M., and Hombe, Hombe (2002). "Environmental Hazards and Landuse Planning for Sustainable Development: the Douala Unstable Coastal Region." In R. G. Macinnes and Jenny Jakeways (eds), Instability: Planning and Management. London: Thomas Telford.
  Lauber, Wolfgang (1988). Architectures allemandes au Cameroun 1884-1914. Stuttgart: Karl Kramer Verlag.
  Levine, Victor (1971). The Cameroon Federal Republic. Ithaca, NY: Cornell University Press.
  Mainet, Guy (1985). Douala, croissance et servitudes. Paris: L'Harmattan.
  Njoh, Ambe (2003). Planning in Contemporary Africa. Aldershot: Ashgate.
  Séraphin, Gilles (2000). "Vivre à Douala. L'imaginaire et l'action dans une ville africaine en crise". Paris: L'Harmattan.
  Simone, A. M. (2004). For the City Yet to Come: Changing African Life in Four Cities. Durham: Duke University Press.
  Soulillou, Jacques (1989), Douala, un siècle en images. Paris: L'Harmattan.

External links

 Official Douala website
 Satellite image of Douala from Google Earth

 
Populated coastal places in Cameroon
Populated places in Littoral Region (Cameroon)
Port cities in Africa
Provincial capitals in Cameroon
Articles containing video clips